Quebrada Arenas (Spanish for sandy creek) is one of the 18 barrios of the municipality of San Juan, Puerto Rico. Located in the southwest corner of San Juan, it is the only rural barrio in the municipality. Quebrada Arenas is totally outside San Juan's municipal urban zone according to the last census.

Quebrada Arenas has boundaries with the municipalities of Aguas Buenas and Caguas to the south, and Guaynabo to the west, and is bounded by Caimito barrios to the east and Tortugo barrio to the north.

Demographics

See also
 List of communities in Puerto Rico

References

Río Piedras, Puerto Rico
Barrios of San Juan, Puerto Rico